Jedko Games is an Australian importer/wholesaler of games, jigsaws, playing cards, wooden toys, board games, traditional games and puzzles. It was originally a publisher of original games and Australian editions of overseas wargames.

The company was founded in the 1970s by John Edwards, the designer of The African Campaign (1973), War at Sea (1975) and The Russian Campaign (1975) which were published by Jedko and later licensed to TSR, Inc. and Avalon Hill.

Other games published by Jedko include an Australian edition of Dungeon!, Alan Jones Formula 1 Grand Prix Racing Game and Basic Training, an introductory wargame between World War II Australian and Japanese in New Guinea.

Brand names imported by Jedko Games includes Holdson (NZ), Jumbo (Netherlands), Piatnik (Austria), Gamewright (USA), Heye (Germany), Eurographics (Canada),Professor Puzzle (UK), Hanayama (Japan), Outset Media (Canada), Gibsons Games (UK), and more.

External links
 Jedko Games homepage.

Board game publishing companies
Toy companies of Australia
Card game publishing companies
Publishing companies established in 1972
Toy companies established in 1972
Australian companies established in 1972
Game manufacturers
Entertainment companies of Australia
Australian games